James David McGee (born 1949) is an American diplomat who served as U.S. Ambassador to Zimbabwe, Swaziland, Madagascar, and the Comoros.

Early life
McGee was born in Chicago, Illinois. He joined the United States Air Force in 1968 and in 1969, he attended the Defense Language Institute in Monterey, California to learn Vietnamese. He served with the 6994th Security Squadron flying aboard EC-47 aircraft in Vietnam during the Vietnam War, earning three Distinguished Flying Crosses. He left the Air Force in 1974. He graduated from Indiana University with a bachelor's degree in political science in 1977. He is married to Shirley Jean French McGee.

Foreign service
He previously served as the third Secretary and Vice Consul at the American Embassy in Lagos, Nigeria from 1982 to 1984, Administrative Officer at the American Consulate General in Lahore, Pakistan from 1984 to 1986, Second Secretary and Supervisory General Services Officer at the American Embassy in The Hague, The Netherlands from 1986 to 1989, Administrative Officer at the American Consulate General in Bombay, India from 1989 to 1991, U.S. Department of State's Special Assistant in the Bureau of Finance and Management Policy from 1991 to 1992, Administrative Counselor in Bridgetown, Barbados from 1992 to 1995, Administrative Counselor at the American Embassy in Kingston, Jamaica from 1995 to 1998, Administrative Counselor in Abidjan, Cote d'Ivoire from 1998 to 2001, and ambassador to Swaziland from 2002 to 2004. McGee became the U.S. ambassador to Madagascar on October 24, 2004, and took on the additional role of ambassador to the Comoros on March 5, 2006. McGee was confirmed by the Senate in October 2007 and succeeded Christopher Dell as U.S. Ambassador to Zimbabwe, serving in that position from 2007 to 2009.

James McGee was threatened with expulsion from Zimbabwe by the president, Robert Mugabe, after McGee had told the press of politically inspired attacks by Mugabe's government against political activists in anticipation of the run-off election between Mugabe and his rival, Morgan Tsvangirai.

References

External links 
 Amb. McGee's Dept of State Bio

1949 births
Living people
Ambassadors of the United States to Madagascar
Ambassadors of the United States to the Comoros
Ambassadors of the United States to Eswatini
Ambassadors of the United States to Zimbabwe
Recipients of the Distinguished Flying Cross (United States)
Indiana University alumni
United States Air Force airmen
United States Air Force personnel of the Vietnam War
African-American diplomats
American expatriates in Nigeria
American expatriates in Pakistan
American expatriates in the Netherlands
American expatriates in India
American expatriates in Jamaica
American expatriates in Ivory Coast
People from Chicago
United States Foreign Service personnel
20th-century African-American people
21st-century African-American people
21st-century American diplomats